Renée is a given name or a surname.

Renée or Renee may also refer to:

People (mononymous)
 Renée (writer) (born 1929), New Zealand feminist writer and playwright

Films
 Renee (2012 film)
 Renée, a 2011 made-for-TV documentary film about Renée Richards

Music

Albums
 Renée Geyer (album)
 Renée Live, Renée Geyer album
 Renee Olstead, self-titled album by Renee Olstead

Songs
 "Renee" (song), a 1996 song by Lost Boyz
 "Renee", a 2013 song by Sales
 "Renée", a song by Talk Talk on their 1984 album It's My Life
 "Walk Away Renée", a song made popular by the band The Left Banke in 1966

See also 
 René